The foot per second squared (plural feet per second squared) is a unit of acceleration. It expresses change in velocity expressed in units of feet per second (ft/s) divided by time in seconds (s) (or the distance in feet (ft) traveled or displaced, divided by the time in seconds (s) squared). The corresponding unit in the International System of Units (SI) is the metre per second squared.

Abbreviations include ft/s2, ft/sec2, ft/s/s, ft/sec/sec, and ft s−2.

Conversions

See also
Gal
Gravitational acceleration
Metre per second squared
Standard gravity

References 

Units of acceleration